al-Khaṭīb ash-Shirbīniy (died 1570 C.E.) was a Shafi'i scholar from Egypt, who wrote many works on exegesis, fiqh, the Arabic language, and other Islamic disciplines. He was initially living in the Dakahlia Governorate, his birthplace, before migrating to Cairo in which he lived for the rest of his life.

See also 
 List of Ash'aris and Maturidis

References

Asharis
Shafi'is
Quranic exegesis scholars
Sunni Muslim scholars of Islam
16th-century Muslim scholars of Islam
16th-century jurists
1570 deaths
Year of birth unknown